Aniridia ataxia renal agenesis psychomotor retardation is a rare genetic disorder characterized by missing irises of the eye, ataxia, psychomotor retardation and abnormal kidneys. It is detected via genetic test.

References

Further reading
 
Genetic disorders with no OMIM

External links